Ena/VASP-like protein is a member of the Ena/VASP family of proteins that in humans is encoded by the EVL gene.

References

Further reading